The 1998 VisionAire 500K was the seventh round of the 1998 Indy Racing League. The race was held on July 25, 1998 at the  Charlotte Motor Speedway in Concord, North Carolina.

Report

Qualifying

Two laps qualifying. The worst lap from any of the drivers are unknown.

  Elected not to qualify after having signed for the ride between practice sessions, and having completed only four laps in practice because of a change in the pedal assembly to fit his size. He was allowed to start the race at the back of the field.
  Had an engine failure during practice, and a spare was not ready on time. He was allowed to start the race at the back of the field.

Failed to qualify or withdrew
 Robby Unser R for Team Cheever - entered for the race, but was sidelined with a concussion suffered at Dover the previous week.

Race

Race Statistics
Lead changes: 19 among 8 drivers

Standings after the race

Drivers' Championship standings

 Note: Only the top five positions are included for the standings.

References

External links
IndyCar official website

1998 in IndyCar
1998 in sports in North Carolina
Motorsport in North Carolina
July 1998 sports events in the United States